Beer Chand Patel Path (formerly Gardiner Road) is major thoroughfare in Patna. It branches off from Income Tax Golamber and terminates at R-Block Golamber.

Overview
R Block is the area near R block Golambar at the confluence of Beer Chand Patel Marg and Hardinge Road. Daroga Prasad Rai Path connects Bir Chand Patel Path with S K Puri. R Block mainly is an area made up of government quarters. It has famous hotels of Patna like Chanakya and Kautilya. It has a large number of government offices and political party's offices. Nav Lakha Durga Mandir is a major landmark of this area. Road or driving distance from Patna Junction railway station to Beer Chand Patel Path is 3 km and from Patna Airport is 4 km.

Major landmarks
Bhartiya Janata Party Pradesh Karlaya
Hotel Chanakya
Hotel Kautilya Bihar, BSTDC
Presidents' Chamber
R Block Chowk (Veer Kunwar Singh Chowk)
Rabindra Bhawan
Hotel Patliputra Ashok
Janata Dal (United) HQ
Rashtriya Janata Dal state office

Nearby places

 New Patna Club (0.2 km)
 Adalat Ganj (0.4 km)
 Patna G.P.O Campus (0.5 km)
 Hardinge Park (0.5 km)
 Adalatganj (0.5 km)
 R Block (0.7 km)
 Patna Women's College (0.7 km)
 Mithapur Railway Over Bridge (0.7 km)
 Mount Carmel High School, Patna (0.8 km)
 Patna Museum Campus (0.9 km)
 Miller School

See also

 Bailey Road, Patna
 Daroga Prasad Rai Path

References

Neighbourhoods in Patna